The 2012–13 Ekstraklasa season was Lechia's 69th since their creation, and was their 5th continuous season in the top league of Polish football.

The season covers the period from 1 July 2012 to 30 June 2013.

Players

First team squad

Transfers

Players In

Out

League

Fixtures for the 2012-13 Ekstraklasa season

League table

Polish Cup

Stats

Goalscorers

References

Lechia Gdańsk seasons
Polish football clubs 2012–13 season